The Treaty of Templin was concluded on 24/25 November 1317, ending a war between the Margraviate of Brandenburg and Denmark, the latter leading a North German alliance. During this war, Brandenburgian margrave Waldemar (also Woldemar) and his troops were decisively defeated in the 1316 Battle of Gransee, fought at Schulzendorf between Rheinsberg and Gransee. After the battle, Brandenburg was forced to negotiate a truce. The treaty of Templin was signed a year later by Danish king Erich VI Menved, his ally duke Henry II of Mecklenburg ("the Lion"), and Waldemar.

Brandenburg had to transfer the terra Burg Stargard, that she had won from the Duchy of Pomerania in 1236 (Treaty of Kremmen), to Mecklenburg. This area would stay with Mecklenburg ever since, from 1701 held by the Dukes of Mecklenburg-Strelitz. Brandenburg also had to level Arnsberg (also "Ahrensberg") castle, and surrender the territories of Schlawe-Stolp (gained from the Principality of Rugia in 1277 and the Teutonic Knights in 1309, after the Treaty of Soldin) to Pomerania-Wolgast.

See also
List of treaties

References

External links
From the Middle of the 13th Century to the Death of Bogislaw X (1250-1523)

History of Pomerania
Duchy of Pomerania
Templin
Treaties of Denmark
Treaties of the Margraviate of Brandenburg
Treaties of Mecklenburg
1310s in Denmark
1310s in the Holy Roman Empire
1317 in Europe
14th century in Denmark